Mitromorpha nofronii is a species of sea snail, a marine gastropod mollusk in the family Mitromorphidae.

Description
The length of the shell attains 5.7 mm.

Distribution
This marine species occurs in the Tyrrhenian Sea, Italy

References

External links
 Amati B., Smriglio C. & Oliverio M. (2015). Revision of the Recent Mediterranean species of Mitromorpha Carpenter, 1865 (Gastropoda, Conoidea, Mitromorphidae) with the description of seven new species. Zootaxa. 3931(2): 151–195
 

nofronii
Gastropods described in 2015